Jordan Casanova (born 30 April 2004) is a Belizean international footballer who plays as a defender for Premier League of Belize side San Pedro Pirates.

Career statistics

International

References

External links
 

2004 births
Living people
Belizean footballers
Belize international footballers
Association football defenders
San Pedro Pirates FC players